Archips philippa is a species of moth of the family Tortricidae. It is found in Iran, Afghanistan, Pakistan and Kashmir.

The wingspan is 19.5–22 mm for males and 22.5 mm for females.

The larvae feed on Pyrus communis, Abelmoschus esculentus, Hedera, Malus, Prunus and Vitis species.

References

Moths described in 1918
Archips
Moths of Asia